Riklis may refer to:

Tel Aviv Open, tennis tournament formerly named the Riklis Classic
1990 Riklis Classic, tennis tournament played on hard courts that was part of the World Series of the 1990 ATP Tour
1991 Riklis Classic, tennis tournament played on hard courts that was part of the World Series of the 1991 ATP Tour

People
Eran Riklis (born 1954), Israeli filmmaker
Meshulam Riklis (1923–2019), Turkish-Israeli businessman and film producer